FK Karađorđe Topola is a football club based in Topola, Serbia. They compete in the Podunavlje-Šumadija Zone League, the fourth tier of the national league system.

History
The club was founded on 16 November 1919 and named after Serbian revolutionist Karađorđe. They changed their name to Oplenac in 1929 and later to Jedinstvo in 1949. In 1954, the club reverted its name to Oplenac and eventually to Karađorđe in 1964.

Following the breakup of Yugoslavia, the club competed in the Serbian League Morava for five seasons between 1997 and 2002. They returned to the third tier in 2014, spending four seasons in the Serbian League West until 2018. In late 2019, the club celebrated its 100th anniversary.

Honours
Šumadija District League (Tier 5)
 2010–11

Notable players
For a list of all FK Karađorđe Topola players with a Wikipedia article, see :Category:FK Karađorđe Topola players.

References

External links
 Club page at Srbijasport

1919 establishments in Serbia
Association football clubs established in 1919
Football clubs in Serbia